Hamzeh (also Romanized as Ḩamzeh; also known as Shahīd Ḩamzeh) is a village in Hoseynabad Rural District, in the Central District of Shush County, Khuzestan Province, Iran. At the 2006 census, its population was 345, in 51 families.

References 

Populated places in Shush County